Katsumura (written: 勝村) is a Japanese surname. Notable people with the surname include:

, Japanese actor
, Japanese actress
, Japanese mixed martial artist

Japanese-language surnames